Versasec AB was founded in 2007 in Stockholm, Sweden. The company produces and sells identity management software for computer security and has specialized in software connecting smart cards to computer systems.

Versasec has developed three product lines:
 vSEC:CMS – credential or smart card management systems for managing PKI tokens, smart cards and digital certificates, generally with the intention to use the credentials as identification tokens and badges in organizations to enable multi-factor authentication and non-repudiation
 vSEC:ID – software for enabling public key operations using smart cards in organizations, for example to use digital signatures
 vSEC:MAIL – software that enables organizations to communicate using encrypted and/or digitally signed email messages

The company has a partnership with Thales CPL(previously Gemalto). The Versasec-Thales partnership began in 2010, and enables the company to offer its products through the Thales partner network. Thales offers vSEC:CMS as part of their product portfolio.

Versasec currently has offices in the following countries:
 Sweden – (Headquarters, Versasec AB, Stockholm and Uppsala)
 Germany – (Research center, Merseburg)
 United Kingdom – (Versasec LTD, Portsmouth)
 United States – (Versasec LLC, Austin, TX)
 Malaysia – (Asia-Pacific Sales and Services, Kuala Lumpur)
 Egypt – (Middle East Sales and Services, Cairo)

During its first four years, Versasec was self-financed. In 2011, the company conducted its first round of financing, raising capital from investors in Sweden, including Almi Invest and Stockholms Affärsänglar (STOAF).

Versasec has been awarded the Dagens industri DI Gasell award three years in a row (2017, 2018 and 2019), recognizing that Versasec as one of the fastest growing profitable companies in Sweden.

External links 
 Versasec versasec.com
 Versasec Partner Network
 
 
 
 
 Security Magazine:
 Security Magazine:
 Security InfoWatch:

Notes

Smart cards
Software companies established in 2007
Companies based in Stockholm
Swedish companies established in 2007
Software companies of Sweden